Kepong Baru MRT station is an elevated Mass Rapid Transit (MRT) station in Kepong, Kuala Lumpur, Malaysia. Serving the Putrajaya Line, the station is located along Jalan Kepong near the junction with Jalan Api Api 1. 

The station began operations on 16 June 2022 as part of Phase One operations of the Putrajaya Line. Like the other elevated stations on the line, Kepong Baru station will have a Serambi-style design with the Japanese zen designs. The station is designed by Ong&Ong.

Location 
The station is located along  .

There is a Buddhist temple called Jing Si Hall (Chinese: 靜思堂), affiliated with the Taiwanese Buddhist order Tzu Chi, located 250m southeast of the station.

Station features 

 Elevated station with island platform

References

External links
 Kepong Baru MRT Station | mrt.com.my
 Klang Valley Mass Rapid Transit
 MRT Hawk-Eye View

Rapid transit stations in Kuala Lumpur
Sungai Buloh-Serdang-Putrajaya Line
Railway stations opened in 2022